Fremont Ross High School (FRHS) is a public high school in Fremont, Ohio, United States. It is the only high school in the Fremont City School District, and one of two high schools in Fremont, the other being Saint Joseph Central Catholic High School. The school enrolls 1,265 students as the 2019-2020 School year.  Fremont Ross is named for W.W. Ross (1834–1906), who served as the first superintendent of Fremont City Schools for 42 years from 1864 until his death in 1906 at the age of 71. Currently There is a new high school being built and is scheduled for completion for the 2021-2022 School Year.

The boys' sports teams are called the "Little Giants", while girls' teams are the "Lady Giants".  The school's colors are purple and white. The football team has a rivalry with Sandusky High School that dates back to 1895, making it the biggest rivalry in Northwest Ohio.

Since the 2011–12 school year, the school has been a member of the Three Rivers Athletic Conference. The school is a future member of the Northern Lakes League as 2023-24 school year.

State championships

 Boys swimming and diving – 1936, 1938, 1939, 1941, 1942, 1943, 1953
 Boys golf – 1973

Notable alumni
Timothy Lull, class of 1961, served as President of Pacific Lutheran Seminary (ELCA) in Berkeley, California
Bob Brudzinski, class of 1973, professional football player in the National Football League (NFL)
Rob Lytle, class of 1973, professional football player in the NFL
Derek Isaman, class of 1985, professional boxer and National Golden Gloves Heavyweight Champion
Shawn McCarthy, class of 1986, professional football player in the NFL
Charles Woodson, class of 1995, 1997 Heisman Trophy winner and Pro Football Hall of Fame inductee. 
Myles Porter, class of 2004, Para Judo athlete and Para Olympic Silver Medalist at the 2012 Para-Olympic games in London.
Jacob Wukie, class of 2004, athlete and silver medalist in archery at the 2012 London Olympics

References

External links
 

Buildings and structures in Fremont, Ohio
High schools in Sandusky County, Ohio
Public high schools in Ohio